Bahadoran or Bahaderan may refer to:
 Bagh-e Bahadoran, a city in Iran
 Bahadoran, Fars, village in Iran
 Bahadoran, Yazd, village in Iran
 Bahadoran Rural District, in Yazd Province, Iran
 Misagh Bahadoran (b. 1987), Filipino footballer